Barend Christiaan van Calker (1738 – 1813), was a Dutch medallist.

Biography
He was born in Kampen and became a master medallist who fulfilled commissions for members of the House of Orange, including a birthday medallion for Willem Frederik van Oranje in 1772.  Like Johann Georg Holtzhey, he is especially known for his awards medals and commemorative medals, and like him also made a medal for the recognition of the United States in 1782.  He made prize medals for the Provinciaal Utrechtsch Genootschap van Kunsten en Wetenschappen in 1773 and the 200-year anniversary medal of Leiden University in 1775. He lived in the Hernhutter Broedergemeenschap, near Castle Zeist where he later died.

References

	
	
	

Dutch medallists
1738 births
1813 deaths
People from Kampen, Overijssel
18th-century Dutch artists
19th-century Dutch artists
18th-century Dutch sculptors
18th-century Dutch male artists
19th-century Dutch sculptors